Rodolfo Xavier Neves (born 13 March 1989) is a Brazilian footballer who plays as a striker.

Career 
Neves started his senior career with Esporte Clube Democrata Governador Valadares and joined in January 2009 on loan to Profute Futebol Clube. After a half year with the São Gonçalo based Profute, returned to Democrata. In the spring of 2010 signed with Americano FC, who played one year, before signed with Associação Desportiva Itaboraí. In January 2012 signed than for Sociedade Desportiva Serra Futebol Clube, before transferred to Bulgarian PSL club PFC Beroe Stara Zagora.

References

External 

1989 births
Living people
Brazilian footballers
Association football forwards
First Professional Football League (Bulgaria) players
PFC Beroe Stara Zagora players